Condoublin was an electoral district of the Legislative Assembly in the Australian state of New South Wales from 1894 to 1901, in the Condobolin area.

History
Prior to 1894 the town, then known as Condoublin, was part of the district of Forbes, which returned two members. Multi-member constituencies were abolished in the 1893 redistribution, resulting in the creation of 76 new districts, including Condoublin. Forbes was abolished and largely divided between the new district of Condoublin and the recreated district of The Lachlan, with the remainder going to Cobar. Condoublin also absorbed part of the abolished district of The Bogan. The electoral district included all of the counties of Cunningham and Kennedy as well as parts of the surrounding counties of Flinders, Narromine and Oxley. At its establishment in 1894 Condoublin had 1,883 enrolled voters, slightly less than the average of 2,046.

Condoublin was abolished in 1904 and absorbed by the districts of Ashburnham, Cobar and The Lachlan.

Members for Condoublin

Election results

References

Former electoral districts of New South Wales
1894 establishments in Australia
1901 disestablishments in Australia
Constituencies established in 1894
Constituencies disestablished in 1901